Tony Harrison (born September 6, 1990) is an American professional boxer. He held the WBC light middleweight title from 2018 to 2019 and challenged once for the IBF light middleweight title in 2017. As of May 2022, Harrison is ranked as the world's fifth best active light middleweight by the Transnational Boxing Rankings Board and sixth by The Ring.

Professional career
Harrison made his professional debut on July 2, 2011, scoring a first-round technical knockout (TKO) over Uwe Tritschler at the Imtech-Arena in Hamburg, Germany.

After compiling a record of 24–1 with 20 knockouts (KO) – his only defeat coming against Willie Nelson via ninth-round TKO in June 2015 – Harrison faced Jarrett Hurd (19-0, 13 KOs) on February 25, 2017, at the Legacy Arena in Birmingham, Alabama, with the bout being televised on Premier Boxing Champions (PBC) on FOX. The fight was supposed to be an IBF title eliminator for the right to fight Jermall Charlo, but when Charlo vacated the title the fight was elevated to be for the vacant title. In the ninth round, Harrison was knocked down by a right hook from Hurd, which resulted in the referee waving off the fight.

Harrison vs. Charlo 
On October 23, 2018, it was announced that Tony Harrison would face Jermell Charlo for the WBC light middleweight title on December 22 on PBC on Fox and Fox Deportes at the Barclays Center in Brooklyn, New York. Harrison won by unanimous decision with two judges scoring the bout 115–113, while the third scored it 116–112.

Harrison vs. Charlo II 
The rematch was a highly competitive bout, in which Charlo managed to regain the WBC light middleweight title. Charlo managed to drop Harrison in the second round, but Harrison managed to recover well. In the eleventh round, Charlo dropped Harrison twice and had him stuck on the ropes when the referee decided to end the fight.

Harrison vs. Garcia 
On April 9, 2022, Harrison faced Sergio Garcia, ranked #4 by the WBC at super welterweight. Harisson won the bout convincingly on the scorecards, 100–90, 100-90 and 98–92.

Harrison vs. Tszyu 
On the 22nd January 2023 it was announced Tony Harrison will be taking on Tim Tszyu for the interim WBO junior middleweight title on March 12 in Australia. He lost the bout by 9th round TKO.

Professional boxing record

See also
List of light-middleweight boxing champions

References

External links

Tony Harrison - Profile, News Archive & Current Rankings at Box.Live

1990 births
Living people
American male boxers
African-American boxers
Boxers from Detroit
Light-middleweight boxers
World light-middleweight boxing champions
World Boxing Council champions
21st-century African-American sportspeople